Salem United Church of Christ, formerly known as Old Salem Reformed Church, is a historic Reformed church at 231 Chestnut Street in Harrisburg, Dauphin County, Pennsylvania. The church was built in 1821–1822, and is a two-story brick building in a Classical style.  It features a large square bell tower topped by a domed cupola.  The tower is flanked by two, three-story towers with stepped gables.  A two-story, Sunday school annex was built to the rear of the church in 1862.

It was added to the National Register of Historic Places in 1975.

References

External links
Salem United Church of Christ website

Churches on the National Register of Historic Places in Pennsylvania
Italianate architecture in Pennsylvania
Churches completed in 1822
19th-century United Church of Christ church buildings
Churches in Harrisburg, Pennsylvania
Churches in Dauphin County, Pennsylvania
National Register of Historic Places in Harrisburg, Pennsylvania
1822 establishments in Pennsylvania
Italianate church buildings in the United States